"We're Going to Be Friends" is a song by American alternative rock band White Stripes from their album White Blood Cells. It was released in late 2002 and tells the story of meeting a new friend at the beginning of a school year. Through its lyrics, it is able to evoke the simplicity and nostalgia of childhood.

Lyrics
"Suzy Lee," who is mentioned in the song in "We're Going to Be Friends", makes recurring appearances in White Stripes' discography, including in their eponymous album, which includes the song "Suzy Lee", as well as on Get Behind Me Satan, which is dedicated to Suzy Lee, "Wherever she may be..."

Themes
The song speaks of a girl and boy who become friends while engaging in activities in and out of school.  AllMusic said the song "takes a nostalgic look back at the innocence of school days with a surprisingly sensitive vocal as [Jack] expertly paints impressions of days past with deft economy."

Video
The video features Jack and Meg White on a couch in front of Jack's house at night time. Jack is playing a guitar, while Meg is sleeping alongside him. Jack wakes Meg as the song ends. The cover of the single is a still from the video.

The video was shot in one take after the band had finished shooting for the video for the song "Hotel Yorba".

Reception
Tom Maginnis with AllMusic called the song a "sweet acoustic ballad," and NME called it "fey childhood-sweetheart folk." The A.V. Club said it was "the album's most shocking track."

In popular culture
Featured in the opening credits of the 2004 film Napoleon Dynamite, writer/director Jared Hess commented that, originally, they could not find the song they were looking for, but wanted to use "We're Going to Be Friends," so a copy of Napoleon Dynamite was sent to The White Stripes, who promptly approved the song's use in the film.

Singer-songwriter Jack Johnson recorded a cover of the song on his album Sing-A-Longs and Lullabies for the Film Curious George. In 2008 and 2009, it was used in a promo for PBS Kids. Bright Eyes covered the song with guest First Aid Kit for the charity album Cool for School: For the Benefit of the Lunchbox Fund.

This song was also played at the end of the House episode entitled "Mirror Mirror", which aired October 30, 2007, although the song is not included in the show's soundtrack.  The song is also featured in the Life in Pieces episode "Sexting Mall Lemonade Heartbreak".  CBS included a song in commercials for its 2006 program The Class that resembled the tune of "We're Going to Be Friends." When magazine Broadcasting & Cable reached out to Monotone Management (the management company of the band at the time), the company declined to comment, but indicated that the band was aware of the song and were not pleased.  In subsequent commercials, CBS used a different song.

This song was featured in the 2017 film Wonder. The film used two versions of the song, the original version performed by the White Stripes and a cover version performed by Caroline Pennell.

This is one of Conan O'Brien's favorite songs by The White Stripes and at his request, they performed it on the final episode of Late Night with Conan O'Brien on February 20, 2009. A portion of the song is also the opening theme to his podcast, Conan O'Brien Needs a Friend.

The song was also featured on episode 5 ("The Jen Show") of the British show Extraordinary.

Track listing

All songs by The White Stripes unless otherwise noted

CD promo
"We're Going to Be Friends"

Children's book adaptation

In May 2017, Third Man Records announced a children's book based on the single to be released on November 21, 2017, shortly after The White Stripes’ 20th anniversary. The book became available on November 7, 2017 for pre-release events and limited distribution. It was illustrated by Elinor Blake, an illustrator and animator for shows such as The Ren and Stimpy Show and Pee-wee's Playhouse. The book came with a digital copy of the original song and a cover version performed by The Woodstation Elementary School Singers, as well as a cover by April March.

References

External links
White Stripes.Net FAQ.  Retrieved September 17.
rollingstone.com

2002 singles
The White Stripes songs
Folk rock songs
Songs about friendship
2001 songs
V2 Records singles
Songs written by Jack White